George Washington Tomlinson House is a historic home located at Indianapolis, Marion County, Indiana.  It was built about 1862, and is a -story, center passage plan, double pile, frame dwelling with Greek Revival and Georgian style design elements. It is sheathed in clapboard siding, has a side gable roof, and four interior end chimneys. The house was moved to its present site in 1979.

It was added to the National Register of Historic Places in 2005.

References

Houses on the National Register of Historic Places in Indiana
Georgian architecture in Indiana
Greek Revival houses in Indiana
Houses completed in 1862
Houses in Indianapolis
National Register of Historic Places in Indianapolis